The God of the Razor is a collection of short stories by American writer Joe R. Lansdale. It also contains the early Lansdale novel The Nightrunners. It was published by Subterranean Press in 2007. Interior illustrations are by artist Glenn Chadborne. Cover artist is Timothy Truman. This book was published as a limited edition and a deluxe lettered edition. Both editions have long sold out.

The character of the God Of the Razor was the basis for the comic book limited series Blood and Shadows published by DC Vertigo in 1996 with art by Mark Nelson. The character also appeared in the Batman story Subway Jack written by Lansdale for the 1989 prose collection The Further Adventures of Batman.

Table of contents
 The Nightrunners
 God of the Razor
 Not From Detroit
 King of Shadows
 Shaggy House
 Incident On and Off a Mountain Road
 Janet Finds the Razor

References

External links
 Author's Official Website
 Publisher's Website

Short story collections by Joe R. Lansdale
2007 short story collections
Horror short story collections
Works by Joe R. Lansdale
Subterranean Press books